Milden Thicks is a  biological Site of Special Scientific Interest east of Great Waldingfield in Suffolk, England. It is in four separate blocks, Bulls Cross Wood, Hazel Wood and the adjoining Hall Wood, Walding Wood and Long Wood.

These are diverse mature woods, described by Natural England as of national importance for the comparisons which can be made between them. There are several wild service trees, and the ground flora is rich and typical of ancient woodland.

References

Sites of Special Scientific Interest in Suffolk
Edwardstone